Zhu De's Former Residence was built during the late Qing Dynasty (1644–1911). It is located in Linlang Village, Ma'an Town, Yilong County, Sichuan, China. It has a building area of about 2560 square meters, embodies buildings such as the old houses, the Zhu De Memorial Hall, the statue of Zhu De, the Cultural relics Exhibition Hall, and Lancao Garden.

History
The house was built by Zhu De's ancestors in 1820, in the 25th year of Jiaqing period (1821–1851) in the Qing dynasty (1644–1911).

On 11 December 1886, Zhu De was born here. Zhu De lived here from the beginning of his life for a full 14 years, and spent his teenage years here.

In July 1980, it was listed as a provincial culture and relics site by the People's Government of Sichuan.

In 1988, it has been designated as a "Major National Historical and Cultural Sites" by the State Council of China.

On 1 August 1982, Deng Xiaoping wrote the Chinese characters "Zhu De's Former Residence" on the horizontal tablet.

On 11 December 1996, the statue of Zhu De was established. At the same year, it was listed as a National Patriotic Education Base.

References

External links
 
 

Buildings and structures in Nanchong
Jiangxi
Tourist attractions in Nanchong
1820 establishments in China
Major National Historical and Cultural Sites in Sichuan
Qing dynasty architecture